Han Lih-wu (26 January 1903 – 26 February 1991) was a Chinese educator, politician and diplomat.

Born in Anhui, Han earned degrees from Nanjing University, the University of London, and the University of Wisconsin–Madison. After completing his education in the United States, Han taught at Nanjing University until 1931, when he was named leader of the British–Chinese Educational Association, where he served until 1946.

In 1944, Han was appointed deputy minister of education. He succeeded Chen Hsueh-ping in office in 1949. Han aided the Kuomintang retreat to Taiwan later that year by moving artworks of the National Palace Museum from Peking to Taipei. He served as the Director of National Palace Museum from September 1949 to June 1956. Upon stepping down from the Ministry of Education in 1950, Han became presidential adviser to Chiang Kai-shek until 1956. He became Republic of China ambassador to Thailand that year, and in 1962, was concurrently assigned to Laos. Han later served as ambassador to the Philippines and Greece, from 1964 to 1968, and between 1968 and 1972, respectively.

References

1903 births
1991 deaths
Ambassadors of the Republic of China
Taiwanese people from Anhui
Republic of China politicians from Anhui
Education Ministers of the Republic of China
Senior Advisors to President Chiang Kai-shek
Nanjing University alumni
Academic staff of Nanjing University
Alumni of the University of London
University of Wisconsin–Madison alumni
Politicians from Chuzhou
Educators from Anhui
Ambassadors of China to Thailand
Ambassadors of the Republic of China to the Philippines
Ambassadors of China to Greece